Agostenga is an alternate name for several wine and table grape varieties including:

Luglienga
Prié blanc
Vermentino